The Shire of Walloon is a former local government area in the south-east of Queensland, Australia. Its administrative centre was in the town of Marburg.

History
On 11 November 1879, the Walloon Division was created as one of 74 divisions within Queensland under the Divisional Boards Act 1879 with a population of 3749.

With the passage of the Local Authorities Act 1902, the Walloon Division became the Shire of Walloon on 31 March 1903.

On 19 January 1912, under the Local Authorities Act 1902, that part of the Shire of Walloon was excised to create the Shire of Lowood, centred on the town of Lowood.

The Greater Ipswich Scheme
On 13 October 1916, a rationalisation of the local government areas in and around Ipswich was implemented. It involved the abolition of five shires:
 Brassall
 Bundanba
 Lowood
 Purga
 Walloon
resulting in:
 a new Shire of Ipswich by amalgamating part of the Shire of Brassall, part of the Shire of Bundanba, part of the Shire of Walloon and all of the Shire of Purga
 an enlarged Shire of Rosewood by including part of the Shire of Walloon
 an enlarged City of Ipswich by including part of the Shire of Brassall and part of the Shire of Bundanba
 an enlarged Shire of Esk by including all of the Shire of Lowood

Chairmen
 1880: Peter Thomson
 1914: J.F. Rea

References

External links
 

 
Former local government areas of Queensland
1879 establishments in Australia
1916 disestablishments in Australia